Traverse County is a county in the U.S. state of Minnesota. As of the 2020 census, the population was 3,360, making it the least-populous county in Minnesota. Its county seat is Wheaton. The county was founded in 1862 and organized in 1881.

Geography
Traverse County lies on the western edge of Minnesota. Its western border abuts the eastern borders of the states of North and South Dakota. The Red River flows northward along the county's western line. The Mustinka River flows southwestward through the county's upper portion, discharging into Lake Traverse. The county terrain consists of low rolling hills, fully devoted to agriculture except in developed areas. The terrain slopes to the west and north, with its highest point at the southeastern corner, at 1,119' (341m) ASL.

Major highways

  U.S. Route 75
  Minnesota State Highway 9
  Minnesota State Highway 27
  Minnesota State Highway 28
  Minnesota State Highway 117

Adjacent counties

 Wilkin County - north
 Grant County - northeast
 Stevens County - southeast
 Big Stone County - south
 Roberts County, South Dakota - southwest

Protected areas
 Reservation Dam State Wildlife Management Area
 White Rock Dam State Wildlife Management Area

Lakes
 Lake Traverse (part)
 Mud Lake - (part)
 Saint Marys Lake
 Wet Lake

Demographics

2000 census
As of the 2000 census, there were 4,134 people, 1,717 households, and 1,129 families in the county.  The population density was 7.2/sqmi (2.78/km2). There were 2,199 housing units at an average density of 3.83/sqmi (1.48/km2). The racial makeup of the county was 96.42% White, 0.02% Black or African American, 2.81% Native American, 0.27% Asian, 0.07% Pacific Islander, 0.05% from other races, and 0.36% from two or more races. 1.21% of the population were Hispanic or Latino of any race. 52.2% were of German, 13.0% Norwegian, 7.6% Swedish and 5.4% Irish ancestry.

There were 1,717 households, out of which 28.30% had children under the age of 18 living with them, 57.00% were married couples living together, 6.00% had a female householder with no husband present, and 34.20% were non-families. 32.00% of all households were made up of individuals, and 19.20% had someone living alone who was 65 years of age or older. The average household size was 2.34 and the average family size was 2.97.

The county population contained 25.30% under the age of 18, 5.60% from 18 to 24, 21.70% from 25 to 44, 21.20% from 45 to 64, and 26.20% who were 65 years of age or older. The median age was 43 years. For every 100 females there were 96.70 males. For every 100 females age 18 and over, there were 93.80 males.

The median income for a household in the county was $30,617, and the median income for a family was $39,655. Males had a median income of $29,821 versus $20,100 for females. The per capita income for the county was $16,378.  About 9.30% of families and 12.00% of the population were below the poverty line, including 13.10% of those under age 18 and 10.80% of those age 65 or over.

2020 Census

Communities

Cities

 Browns Valley
 Dumont
 Tintah
 Wheaton (county seat)

Unincorporated communities

 Boisberg
 Charlesville (partial)
 Collis
 Dakomin

Townships

 Arthur Township
 Clifton Township
 Croke Township
 Dollymount Township
 Folsom Township
 Lake Valley Township
 Leonardsville Township
 Monson Township
 Parnell Township
 Redpath Township
 Tara Township
 Taylor Township
 Tintah Township
 Walls Township
 Windsor Township

Government and Politics
Traverse County has a balanced electorate. Since 1980 the county has selected the Republican Party candidate 54% of the time in national elections (as of 2020).

See also 
 National Register of Historic Places listings in Traverse County, Minnesota

References

 
Minnesota counties
1881 establishments in Minnesota
Populated places established in 1881